Jean-Louis Légaré was a French-Canadian trader and one of the founding members of Willow Bunch, Saskatchewan.

He was born in Saint-Jacques, Quebec October 25, 1841 and left in 1866 to find work first in the eastern United States, then in Minnesota. After working as a clerk and freighter around Pembina, North Dakota he opened a trading post in 1871 at Wood Mountain, Saskatchewan then a Métis hivernant settlement. He married Marie Ouellette in 1873 who bore him a son Albert Joseph. 
His wife died in 1876 and he never remarried. 

Between 1876 and 1881 nearly 5,000 Sioux and their chief Sitting Bull took refuge in the Wood Mountain region after the Battle of the Little Big Horn and traded at his post. By 1879 the Sioux were destitute because the buffalo had disappeared from the area.  Légaré spent a great deal of effort and supplies to feed the starving Sioux. Since the U.S. government offered amnesty and supplies Légaré at the request of L.N.F. Crozier (North-West Mounted Police) persuaded them to return to the United States. He accompanied Sitting Bull to Fort Buford in 1881.
 

During the North-West Rebellion in 1885 he negotiated with the federal government for the employment of 40 Métis from the area. They  patrolled the Canada–United States border as scouts during the Métis resistance. 

In the 1880s he was a cattle and horse rancher in the Willow Bunch area. Légaré became one of the first postmasters of Willow Bunch in 1898 and again in 1902 and held the position until his death on February 1, 1918.

Legacy
In 1960 the Jean-Louis Légaré Regional Park was established 2 km west of Willow Bunch.

In 1969 Jean-Louis Légaré was designated by the Canadian government as being nationally significant in the history of the country. 
A plaque in Willow Bunch reads: 

Jean-Louis Légaré was recognized in Saskatchewan with The Jean-Louis Légaré Act in 1993.

References

External links
 

1841 births
1918 deaths
Persons of National Historic Significance (Canada)